Jean-Julien Rojer and Horia Tecău were the defending champions, but lost in the first round to Nick Kyrgios and Jack Sock.

Łukasz Kubot and Marcelo Melo won the title, defeating Nicolas Mahut and Édouard Roger-Vasselin in the final, 7–5, 6–3.

Seeds
All seeds receive a bye into the second round.

Draw

Finals

Top half

Bottom half

References
 Main Draw

Men's Doubles